Eveline Saalberg (born 30 July 1998) is a Dutch track and field athlete who specialises in the 400 metres. She won four major medals as part of the Dutch 4 × 400 metres relays, either women's or mixed.

Professional career
Saalberg started athletics at the age of eight. She became a member of GVAC. In the youth categories she competed in, she won several medals at Dutch junior championships. During her student days she distinguished herself by becoming a multiple Dutch student champion. She combined all this with a board year as chair of the Student Athletics Association MSAV Uros.

Saalberg experienced her breakthrough at the 2019 Dutch Athletics Championships in The Hague. Completely against expectations, she won the title in the 400 m hurdles there. She went under the minute for the first time with a time of 58.86 s. Afterwards, she stated that on a training holiday in South Tyrol, she could fully focus on the technique of hurdling. In the autumn of 2019, Saalberg joined the training group of athletics coach Laurent Meuwly to train at the National Sports Centre Papendal alongside Eva Hovenkamp and Femke Bol.

Her personal bests in the 400 metres are 51.22 seconds outdoors (Huelva 2022) and 52.54 seconds indoors (Apeldoorn 2022).

References

External links

1998 births
Living people
Dutch female hurdlers
Dutch female middle-distance runners
World Athletics Championships athletes for the Netherlands
World Athletics Indoor Championships medalists
21st-century Dutch women
Sportspeople from Arnhem
European Athletics Championships winners